Drowning in Dreams is a Canadian documentary film, directed by Tim Southam and released in 1997. The film centres on Fred Broennle, a German-Canadian businessman from Thunder Bay, Ontario, who engaged in a multi-year effort to raise the shipwrecked Gunilda from the bottom of Lake Superior.

The film premiered at the 1997 Toronto International Film Festival.

The film received a Genie Award nomination for Best Feature Length Documentary at the 18th Genie Awards.

References

External links
 

1997 films
1997 documentary films
Canadian documentary films
National Film Board of Canada documentaries
1990s English-language films
1990s Canadian films